In 1933, London's underground railways, tramway companies and bus operators merged to form the London Passenger Transport Board (LPTB), commonly known as London Transport. London Transport numbered all of its service stock locomotives into one unified series, regardless of the type.

References

Footnotes

Sources
 

History of the London Underground
London Underground locomotives
Standard gauge locomotives of Great Britain